Urs Käufer (born 17 November 1984 in Neu-Ulm, Bavaria) is a German former representative rower. He won a world championship title in 2009 in the German men's eight.

References 
 
 

1984 births
Living people
People from Neu-Ulm
Sportspeople from Swabia (Bavaria)
Olympic rowers of Germany
Rowers at the 2008 Summer Olympics
Rowers at the 2012 Summer Olympics
World Rowing Championships medalists for Germany
German male rowers